Buzet-sur-Tarn (literally Buzet on Tarn) is a commune in the Haute-Garonne department in southwestern France. Roqueserière-Buzet station has rail connections to Toulouse, Albi and Rodez.

Population

See also
Communes of the Haute-Garonne department

References

Communes of Haute-Garonne